Dataone may refer to:
BSNL Broadband or Dataone, an Internet access service in India since 2005
DataONE, a cyberinfrastructure project supported by the National Science Foundation under the DataNet program